Bill Miller (February 3, 1915 – July 11, 2006) was an American jazz pianist, who accompanied Frank Sinatra for more than 50 years, and for the last eight years of his life, accompanied Frank Sinatra Jr.

Life and career
Miller was born in Brooklyn, New York. Performing with Red Norvo, Mildred Bailey and Charlie Barnet in the 1930s, Miller also performed with Tommy Dorsey and Benny Goodman.

First meeting Sinatra in 1941, they did not work together until November 1951, when Miller was performing in the lounge of the Desert Inn, in Las Vegas. Sinatra was having difficulty holding on to pianists, and it was Jimmy Van Heusen who recommended Miller to Sinatra.

Miller's house was destroyed in a 1964 mudslide in Burbank, California, which also claimed the life of his wife, Aimee. He was abruptly dismissed for no apparent reason by Sinatra in 1978, but was invited back in 1985.

Sinatra died in 1998, and Miller performed "One for My Baby (and One More for the Road)" at his funeral. He retired for three years, and then came out of retirement to work for Sinatra's son, Frank Sinatra, Jr.

Bill Miller also played on the recreation of Silent Night, re-recorded after Sinatra's death with a full orchestra.

Miller died "on the road", while touring with Sinatra, Jr., from complications following a heart attack, at Montreal General Hospital at age 91.

Selected discography
with Buddy Collette
Buddy Collette's Swinging Shepherds (EmArcy, 1958)
At the Cinema! (Mercury, 1959)
with Frank Sinatra
Songs for Young Lovers (1954)
In the Wee Small Hours (1955)
Frank Sinatra Sings for Only the Lonely (1958)
Sinatra & Sextet: Live in Paris (1962)
Sinatra At The Sands (1966)
Cycles (1968)
The Main Event – Live (1974)
Duets (1993)
Duets II (1994)
Sinatra: Vegas (2006)
Sinatra: New York (2009)
Live at the Meadowlands (2009)
Sinatra: London (2014)
Ultimate Sinatra (2015)
with Robbie Williams
Swing When You're Winning (2001)
 Frank Sinatra with the Red Norvo Quintet: Live in Australia, 1959

References

External links

 1970 interview with Miller
 Allboutjazz obituary
 Army Archerd obituary
 New York Sun obituary
 Npr.org obituary
 Washington Post obituary

American pianists
1915 births
2006 deaths
Musicians from Brooklyn
American male pianists
20th-century American male musicians